Collège Boréal is a French-language College of Applied Arts and Technology serving Northern and Central Southwestern Ontario. Youngest of the 24 Colleges of Applied Arts and Technology, Collège Boréal has for the 12th time in 13 years achieved the highest graduation rate and for the 9th time in 12 years, the highest graduate satisfaction rate among all the community colleges in Ontario. Based in Sudbury, Ontario, Canada, Collège Boréal has a total of 42 access centres across 28 cities in the province, including main campuses in Hamilton, Hearst, Kapuskasing, London, Nipissing, Sudbury, Timmins, Toronto, Welland, and Windsor. Collège Boréal, which began operations in 1995, is a postsecondary institution in which students are offered technical programs helping them gain access to a bilingual labour market. In 2002, Collège Boréal opened a campus in Toronto, taking over the programs and services of the defunct Collège des Grands-Lacs. Inaugurated on September 27, 2012, the new Toronto campus is now located at One Yonge Street.

Presidents of Collège Boréal
Daniel Giroux is the current president of the college. Daniel Giroux was previously the vice president of workforce and business development at Collège Boréal and succeeded Pierre Riopel in 2016. Pierre Riopel succeeded Denis Hubert-Dutrisac, who retired in 2013.  Hubert-Dutrisac succeeded Gisèle Chrétien in 2006, when she was appointed president of the French-language television channel TFO.

Programs
Collège Boréal offers 78 postsecondary and apprenticeship programs in its five schools; the School of Health Sciences, the School of Trades and Applied Technologies, the School of Arts, the School of Advancement, and the School of Business and Community Services.

In cooperation with Contact North, 112 online training centres and 31 videoconference rooms are also available throughout the Collège Boréal network.

Residences
The residences comprise 70 units, housing 138 students (most units house 2 students).

Facilities
Besides its campuses and access centres, Collège Boréal has facilities with varied educational objectives in a number of activity sectors. Health sciences, trades, culinary arts, community services and environmental technologies are among the main fields of expertise.

In 2007, the second floor of the main building of the college became the official home of the Minshall Museum. A gift from the family of the late Aubrey Minshall, this collection of naturalized animals is a treasure trove for students in the Natural Resources programs.

In 2009, the Xstrata Nickel Biodiversity Applied Research Centre was opened at the main campus in Sudbury. With a production capacity of 500,000 trees per year, the centre contributes to the effort of regreening Greater Sudbury as well as the mining businesses in the northern part of the province. Since 2011, a 2,100-acre experimental forest was added, providing more field experience to students in the forestry programs.

In 2010, the Louis-Riel Centre was opened; its mission is to offer a broad range of services to aboriginal students. Various workshops and shows are presented every year, such as the Aboriginal Pride Nights that hosted artists Florent Vollant and Elisapie Isaac in 2013.

In 2011, the college opened a new restaurant, Au pied du rocher, allowing the students of the culinary arts to display their talents. The program is run in partnership with Niagara College's Canadian Food and Wine Institute.

In 2012, Collège Boréal opened a new campus in the heart of Toronto at One Yonge Street. The same year a new 358-seat concert hall also opened its doors to the great delight of art and culture lovers in Greater Sudbury. Furthermore, since 1997, the Sudbury theatre production centre, the Théâtre du Nouvel-Ontario (TNO), has been housed on the main campus in Sudbury.

Partnerships
Collège Boréal has over 250 business and community partners across its territory. The partnerships are the breeding ground for many initiatives and much resource sharing and thus contribute to the vitality of Francophonie in Ontario.

Through its network of access centres, Collège Boréal provides continuing education, employment services, immigrant integration and other social programs in Barrie, Brampton, Capreol, Chelmsford, Coniston, Dowling, Elliot Lake, Garson, Greater Sudbury, Hamilton, Hearst, Kapuskasing, Leamington, Lively, London, Mississauga, Sturgeon Falls, Noëlville, North Bay, New Liskeard, Scarborough, Smooth Rock Falls, Timmins, Toronto, Val-Caron, Welland and Windsor.

Over the years, Collège Boréal has also signed 27 articulation agreements with nine Canadian universities to facilitate the graduation process of its qualified graduates. While meeting the admission criteria of the universities that signed the agreements, many of Boréal's graduates see their postsecondary curriculum optimized.

At the international level, the college has many partnerships with institutions in other countries – in particular with Costa Rica – for a broader transmission of expertise through various assistance and technical training programs.

Sports
Collège Boréal is a member of the Ontario Colleges Athletic Association (OCAA), Canadian Colleges Athletic Association (CCAA). Les Vipères, the Collège team, is successful in four different sports: Badminton, Golf, Hockey and Volleyball.

See also
 Higher education in Ontario
 List of colleges in Ontario

References

External links
 Collège Boréal

Boreal
French-language universities and colleges in Ontario
Universities in Ontario
Educational institutions established in 1995
Education in Greater Sudbury
1995 establishments in Ontario